Sympathy for the Devil is a compilation  album by Laibach and follows on from their The Beatles cover album Let It Be. Sympathy for the Devil features seven cover versions of The Rolling Stones song "Sympathy for the Devil" and one original Laibach track.  The tracks are recorded both by Laibach and a variety of side projects with Laibach members (including Dreihunderttausend Verschiedene Krawalle (300.000 V.K.) and Germania).

Track listing
Laibach: "Sympathy for the Devil (Time for a Change)" – 5:43
Laibach: "Sympathy for the Devil (Dem Teufel zugeneigt)" – 4:54
300.000 V.K.: "Sympathy for the Devil (Anastasia)" or "Anastasia" – 5:32
Germania: "Sympathy for the Devil (Who Killed the Kennedys – instrumental)" – 5:53
Germania: "Sympathy for the Devil (Who Killed the Kennedys)" – 7:04
300.000 V.K.: "Sympathy for the Devil (Soul to Waste)" – 4:52
Laibach: "Sympathy for the Devil" – 7:52
300.000 V.K.: "Sympathy for the Devil (Soul to Waste – instrumental)" – 7:52
All tracks written by Jagger/Richards, except track 3 written by Laibach.
The above is the final release from 1990, which compiles every version of the song that was previously released on two 12" singles and two CD singles in the UK in 1988.  Track 1 is an edited version of track 7.

Legacy
In 2015 Sympathy for the Devil album cover was ranked 37th on the list of 100 Greatest Album Covers of Yugoslav Rock published by web magazine Balkanrock.

References

1988 EPs
Laibach (band) albums
Covers EPs
The Rolling Stones